Nadya is a feminine given name, sometimes a short form (hypocorism) of Nadezhda or other names.

Nadya is used predominantly throughout the Mediterranean region, Eastern Europe, Latin America, the Caucasus, and the Arab world. It has also seen some popularity in Quebec, France and Ireland. Its origins are in the Slavic and Ancient Greek languages. Variations include: Nadja, Nadia, Nadine, Nadiya, and Nadiia.

The name Nadya (or Nadia) means "hope" in many Slavic languages, e.g. Ukrainian Nadiya (Надія, accent on the i), Belarusian Nadzeya (Надзея, accent on the e), and Old Polish Nadzieja, all of which are derived from Old East Slavic. In Bulgarian and Russian, on the other hand, Nadia or Nadya (Надя, accent on first syllable) is the diminutive form of the full name Nadyezhda (Надежда), meaning "hope" and derived from Old Church Slavonic, which it entered as a translation of the Greek word ελπίς (Elpis), with the same meaning.

The name's early roots and origins date back to Ancient Greece mythology. In most other languages, it is a name in its own right.

In Arabic, Nadiyyah means "tender" and "delicate".

People

Nadya A.R. (born 1971), Pakistani author
Nadezhda Nadya Dorofeeva (born 1990), Ukrainian pop singer and fashion designer
Nadya Khamitskaya (born 1982), Belarusian-born Norwegian dancer
Nadezhda Krupskaya (1869–1939), Russian Bolshevik revolutionary and politician, wife of Vladimir Lenin
Nadya Larouche (born 1956), Canadian writer of children's books and theatre plays
Nadya Mason, American physicist and former gymnast
Nadya Melati, Indonesian badminton player
Nadya Rusheva (1952–1969), Russian painter and illustrator
Nadya Suleman (born 1975), American single mother nicknamed "Octomom"
Nadezhda Tolokonnikova (born 1989), Russian artist, political activist and prisoner of conscience
Nadya, the prison guard in Muppets Most Wanted
Nadya Zhexembayeva, a Kazakh scientist and author

See also
Nadia (given name)
Nadja (disambiguation)

Feminine given names
Hypocorisms